Juss Laansoo (born 23 April 1983) is an Estonian motorcycle racer.

He was born in Tallinn.

He started his motorsport training in 1990 under the guidance of his father. In 2002 he won Juniors Motocross European Championships. He has competed at European Motocross Championship. He is 11-times Estonian champion. 1998–2010 he was a member of Estonian national motocross team.

References

External links

Living people
1983 births
Estonian motorcycle racers
Sportspeople from Tallinn